Bhagowal may refer to following villages in Punjab, Pakistan:

 Bhagowal (District Sialkot), in the District of Sialkot
 Bhagowal Kalan, in the District of Gujrat
 Bhagowal Khurd, in the District of Gujrat
 Bhagwal, in the District of Chakwa
 Chak no.22 Bhagowal, in the District of Mandi Bahauddin